Edward Payson Evans (December 8, 1831 – March 6, 1917) was an American scholar, linguist and early advocate for animal rights. He is best known for his 1906 book on animal trials, The Criminal Prosecution and Capital Punishment of Animals.

Biography 
Evans was born in Remsen, New York in 1831. His father was a Welsh Presbyterian clergyman. Evans earned a Bachelor of Arts from the University of Michigan in 1854. He then taught at an academy in Hernando, Mississippi, for one year, before becoming a professor at Carroll University (then Carroll College) in Waukesha, Wisconsin.

From 1858 to 1862, he traveled abroad, studying at the universities of Göttingen, Berlin and Munich.

On his return to the United States, he became professor of modern languages at the University of Michigan. In 1868, he married Elizabeth Edson Gibson. In 1870, Evans resigned his position at Michigan and went abroad again, where he gathered materials for a history of German literature, and also made a specialty of oriental languages. While living in Munich, he became a fixture at the Royal Library of Munich, and joined the staff of the political journal Allgemeine Zeitung in 1884.

Evans' wife died in 1911 and when World War I broke out in 1914, he returned to the United States, where he lived in Cambridge, Massachusetts and New York City.

Evans died at his home in New York on March 6, 1917.

Legacy 
Evans' 1906 book The Criminal Prosecution and Capital Punishment of Animals, is considered to be the seminal work on the topic of animal trials. In recent years the book has been the subject of several critiques.

Environmental historian Roderick Nash argues that both Evans and J. Howard Moore, "deserve more recognition than they have received as the first professional philosophers in the United States to look beyond anthropocentrism."

Selected works

Articles 
 "Linguistic Paleontology", The Atlantic Monthly, Vol. 53, Iss. 5, May 1884, pp. 613–622
 "Bugs and Beasts before the Law", The Atlantic Monthly, Vol. 54, Iss. 2, Aug. 1884, pp. 235–247
 "Artists and Art Life in Munich", Cosmopolitan, Vol. 9, Iss. 1, May 1890, pp. 3–13
 "Speech as a Barrier Between Man and Beast", The Atlantic Monthly, Vol. 68, Iss. 3, Sept. 1891, pp. 299–312
 "The Nearness of Animals to Men", The Atlantic Monthly, Volume 69, Iss. 2, Feb. 1892, pp. 171–184
"Ethical Relations Between Man and Beast", Popular Science Monthly, Volume 45, Sept. 1894

Books 
 Abriss der deutschen Literaturgesehichte (New York: Leypoldt & Holt, 1869)
 A Progressive German Reader: With notes and a Complete Vocabulary (New York: Holt & Williams, 1869)
 Animal Symbolism in Art and Literature (London: W. Heinemann, 1896)
 Animal Symbolism in Ecclesiastical Architecture (New York: H. Holt and Company, 1896)
 History of German Literature in (5 vols., 1898)
 Evolutional Ethics and Animal Psychology (New York: D. Appleton & Company, 1897)
 The Criminal Prosecution and Capital Punishment of Animals (London: W. Heinemann, 1906)

Translations 
 Adolf Stahr, The Life and Works of Gotthold Ephraim Lessing (with an introduction; 2 vols., Boston, 1866)
 Athanase Josué Coquerel, First Historical Transformations of Christianity (1867)

References

External links 

 
 
 
 

1831 births
1917 deaths
19th-century American male writers
19th-century American translators
20th-century American male writers
20th-century American translators
American animal rights scholars
American people of Welsh descent
American philologists
Carroll University faculty
Linguists from the United States
People from Remsen, New York
University of Michigan alumni
University of Michigan faculty